6250 Saekohayashi, provisional designation , is a bright Hungaria asteroid and relatively slow rotator from the inner regions of the asteroid belt, approximately 3.7 kilometers in diameter. It was discovered on 2 November 1991, by American astronomer Eleanor Helin at Palomar Observatory in California, and later named after Japanese astronomer Saeko Hayashi.

Orbit and classification 

Saekohayashi is a member of the Hungaria family, which form the innermost dense concentration of asteroids in the Solar System. It orbits the Sun at a distance of 1.8–2.1 AU once every 2 years and 8 months (981 days). Its orbit has an eccentricity of 0.07 and an inclination of 20° with respect to the ecliptic.

Physical characteristics

Slow rotation and shape 

In 2009, a rotational lightcurve of Saekohayashi was obtained by American astronomer Brian Warner at his Palmer Divide Observatory, Colorado. It gave a long rotation period of  hours with a high brightness variation of 0.78 magnitude. A high brightness amplitude typically indicates that the body has a non-spheroidal shape. While not being a slow rotator, it has a notably longer than average period.

Diameter and albedo 

The Collaborative Asteroid Lightcurve Link assumes a high albedo of 0.30, typical for E-type asteroids, and calculates a diameter of 3.7 kilometers with an absolute magnitude of 14.1.

Naming 

This minor planet was named after Japanese astronomer Saeko S. Hayashi (born 1958), associate professor at the National Astronomical Observatory of Japan, who works with the Subaru Telescope. Her research includes the formation processes of planetary systems. Saeko is also dedicated to the popularization of astronomy in Hawaii and Japan and is an active member of the International Astronomical Union. The official naming citation was published by the Minor Planet Center 15 February 1995 .

References

External links 
  
 Lightcurve plot of 6250 Saekohayashi (1991 VX1), Palmer Divide Observatory, B. D. Warner (2009)
 Asteroid Lightcurve Database (LCDB), query form (info )
 Dictionary of Minor Planet Names, Google books
 Asteroids and comets rotation curves, CdR – Observatoire de Genève, Raoul Behrend
 Discovery Circumstances: Numbered Minor Planets (5001)-(10000) – Minor Planet Center
 
 

006250
Saekohayashi
Named minor planets
19911102